"Baby's Back Again" is a single by American country music artist Connie Smith.  Released in December 1967, the song reached #7 on the Billboard Hot Country Singles chart. The single was later released on Smith's 1968 album entitled I Love Charley Brown.  The song became Smith's first single to chart on the Canadian RPM Country Tracks chart, reaching #7 as well.

Chart performance

References

1967 singles
Connie Smith songs
Song recordings produced by Bob Ferguson (musician)
1967 songs
RCA Victor singles
Songs written by Betty Jean Robinson